CPR Toronto Yard is a facility located in northeast Toronto, Ontario, Canada, often incorrectly referred to as Agincourt Yard because it is located in Agincourt, a neighbourhood of Toronto.

The yard is divided up into the following (North to South):
A Yard, consisting of ten tracks.
B Yard, consisting of ten tracks.
C Yard, formerly consisting of 72 classification tracks.
D Yard, former railcar repair shop area. Partially taken over by the diesel shop.
E Yard, Diesel Shop tracks.
F Yard, consisting of ten tracks.
G Yard, consisting of five tracks.

Prior to being a railyard, the area was home to farms in the area known as Brown's Corners. A large hill, Fisher's Hill, overlooked the area and was leveled to prepare the building of the railyard. Highland Creek flows in the northeast corner.

Opened in April 1964, the facility was designed as a hump yard, and is bounded by Sheppard Avenue to the south, McCowan Road to the west, Markham Road to the east and Finch Avenue to the north.

This yard replaced the old CPR Lambton Yard and West Toronto Yard as the main freight marshalling yard. The yard can be accessed from Markham and McCowan Roads.

Railway repair equipment is stored along the east side of the facility.

After Hunter Harrison became CEO of Canadian Pacific in 2012 he mandated that hump yards cost too much money to operate and ordered most of CP's humps closed (with the exception of Pig's Eye Yard in St. Paul, Minnesota). This included the hump and the classification yard here in Toronto. After the closure the east end of the 72 classification tracks remained, but during Hunter Harrison's tenure they were eventually removed.

See also 
Facilities of the Canadian Pacific Railway

External links 
 CPR

Canadian Pacific Railway facilities
Rail yards in Toronto